Good Morning America Weekend (often abbreviated as GMA Weekend) is an American morning television program that is broadcast on ABC. 

The first weekend edition of Good Morning America premiered on January 3, 1993, airing only on Sundays; it was hosted at various points by Willow Bay, Aaron Brown, John Hockenberry, Dana King, Lisa McRee, Antonio Mora, Kevin Newman and Bill Ritter. The program was cancelled on February 28, 1999.

In August 2010, Bill Weir left the weekend edition to become co-anchor of Nightline; Marysol Castro left the show the following month. While Dan Harris officially took over as Weir's replacement that October, meteorologists from various ABC affiliates across the country filled in to provide the national weather segments for over a year after Castro's departure; eventually in November 2011, Ginger Zee, who previously served as a meteorologist at NBC O&O WMAQ-TV in Chicago, was appointed as weather anchor for the weekend editions. After Zee was promoted to weather anchor of the weekday edition of Good Morning America in December 2013, the program returned to having ABC affiliate meteorologists to substitute on the Saturday and Sunday editions, until ABC announced the appointment of Rob Marciano (a former CNN meteorologist who had recently departed as co-host of Entertainment Tonight) as full-time weekend weather anchor in July 2014, effective that September.

In July 2014, Bianna Golodryga announced she would be leaving ABC to take a correspondent role at Yahoo News. Paula Faris (who previously substituted for Golodryga in the spring of 2012, while she was on maternity leave) was named as Golodryga's replacement as weekend co-anchor.

On October 5, 2019, the Saturday edition of GMA expanded to two hours (thus meeting the runtimes of Weekend Today and CBS This Morning Saturday), with around 100 affiliates carrying the full program in some form (either the entire duration or in two separate timeslots) by the end of the year. The expansion comes as the FCC's reforms of regulations of children's television programming will allow stations to carry Litton's Weekend Adventure in the 6 a.m. local timeslot, opening up the time period once the college football season ends.

On August 8, 2021, Harris announced that he would be leaving ABC News. His last day was September 26, 2021

On-air staff

Current 
 Eva Pilgrim – co-host/anchor (2018–present)
 Whit Johnson – co-host/anchor (2018–present)
 Janai Norman – co-host/anchor (2022–present)

Former on-air staff

Anchors 
 Bill Ritter (1993–1994 and 1997–1998; now at WABC-TV in New York City)
 Dana King (1993; retired from journalism)
 Lisa McRee (1993–1994; now at Spectrum News 1 in Los Angeles as anchor)
 Willow Bay (1994–1998)
 Antonio Mora (1994–1995; later at Al-Jazeera America)
 John Hockenberry (1995–1996)
 Kevin Newman (1996–1997; now at CTV News)
 Aaron Brown (1998–1999)
 Bill Weir (2004–2010; now at CNN)
 Kate Snow (2004–2010; now at NBC News)
 Bianna Golodryga (2010–2014; later at CBS News; now at CNN)
 Rachel Smith – lifestyle anchor (2012–2014; remains with GMA as features correspondent and as substitute weekend lifestyle anchor)
 Sara Haines – lifestyle anchor (2013–2016; remains with ABC – went on to co-host The View and previously co-hosted Strahan, Sara and Keke)
 Paula Faris – co-host (2014–2018; retired from ABC News)
 Ron Claiborne – news anchor (2004–2018; retired)
 Dan Harris – host/anchor (2010–2021)

Weather anchors 
 Marysol Castro (2004–2010; now PA announcer for New York Mets baseball at Citi Field)
 Ginger Zee (2011–2013; now weather anchor of the program's weekday editions)
 Rob Marciano – senior meteorologist (2014–2022)
 Cheryl Scott – senior meteorologist (2022–2023)
 Somara Theodore – senior meteorologist (2023–present)

References

1990s American television news shows
Television morning shows in the United States
English-language television shows
ABC News